Laava may refer to:

 Fernanda Brandão, Brazilian singer, dancer and recording artist based in Munich, Germany